Jordan Alexander Beck (born April 19, 2001) is an American baseball outfielder in the Colorado Rockies organization. He played college baseball for the Tennessee Volunteers.

Early life and amateur career
Beck grew up in Hazel Green, Alabama and attended Hazel Green High School, where he played baseball and basketball. He helped the Trojans to win the 2018 State championship in baseball and also helped the Trojans to the final four in basketball. As a senior, he batted .500 with 13 home runs, 16 doubles, 52 hits, and 52 RBIs. Beck was selected in the 14th round of the 2019 MLB Draft by the Boston Red Sox, but did not sign with the team.

Beck batted .275 five doubles, one home run, and nine RBIs through 10 games during his true freshman season before it was cut short due to the coronavirus pandemic. As a sophomore, he hit for a .271 average with 16 doubles, 15 home runs and 64 RBIs. After the 2021 season, Beck played collegiate summer baseball for the Harwich Mariners of the Cape Cod Baseball League. Beck was named to the watchlist for the Golden Spikes Award entering his junior season.

Professional career
The Colorado Rockies selected Beck 38th overall in the 2022 Major League Baseball draft. He signed with the team on July 28, 2022, and received a signing bonus of $2.2 million.

References

External links

Tennessee Volunteers bio

Tennessee Volunteers baseball players
Harwich Mariners players
Baseball players from Alabama
Baseball outfielders
2001 births
Living people
Arizona Complex League Rockies players